Berck, sometimes referred to as Berck-sur-Mer (literally Berck on Sea), is a commune in the northern French department of Pas-de-Calais. It lies within the Marquenterre regional park, an ornithological nature reserve.

Geography
Situated just to the north of the estuary of the river Authie, Berck has a huge expanse of sandy beach and impressive grassy-topped dunes facing north onto the English Channel. The town comprises two parts – to the east, the old fishing town of Berck-Ville and to the west the seaside area, Berck-sur-Mer.

Toponymy
Berck is attested through the centuries in various forms: datum Bergis and Berc in 1215, Bierk in 1282.

Its origin has been conjectured to come either from Germanic berg "hill", "mount" or birkja "place of the birch trees", designating the birch tree wood nearby. The Modern Dutch word for "birch" is berk.

In Dutch the name is Berk-aan-Zee.

History
The old town was formerly a fishing harbour which in 1301 was recorded to have 150 homesteads with 800 inhabitants. A mediaeval wooden lighthouse, known locally as a foïer, was built on a dune and lit by charcoal and faggots but this burned down several times. On one occasion at least it was as a result of the continuous conflict between the English and the French in the Hundred Years War. The chronicler Enguerrand de Monstrelet mentions that during 1414 the English garrison in Calais raided south and burned the town. Eventually the lighthouse was replaced by a stone tower at the side of which a chapel was built in the 15th century, but this did not save it from further mishap. During the second siege of Montreuil in 1544, the English advanced from the south and burned 200 houses, the church and the mill as they passed through Berck. What was left of the place was then burned by the French on their way to relieve the siege.

The chapel was later extended to join the tower, making what is now the church of St-Jean-Baptiste, but the tower was only converted to a belfry after the sea retired, leaving it 1.5 kilometres inland. It is for this reason that the present division between the original village and the sea-front area exists. As a result, boats were then designed with flat bottoms so that they could be drawn up on the beach and a cart was driven out to them in order to bring in the catch (see Eugène Boudin's painting below).

In the mid-19th century, Berck took on a therapeutic role in the treatment of tuberculosis. The Maritime hospital was inaugurated in 1869 by Empress Eugenie. Other hospitals and benevolent institutes were soon created to cater for the sick and those in need of rest and recuperation. It was at this time that the medical benefits of sea bathing were being recommended and the town, advertised as just a three-hour journey from Paris, began to build up its tourist trade with the help of the railways.

At first one had to alight at the nearby town of Verton on the main line to Calais, but in 1893 a  branch line was built connecting it with other towns in the region. As well as carrying passengers, there was also goods traffic from the brick-works at Berck Ville. Known locally as le Tortillard for its wandering route, it was closed in 1955. There was a later narrow-gauge line running northwards through the dunes from Berck Plage to Paris-Plage, as Le Touquet was then known. It was built in stages via Merlimont between 1909 and 1912 but gradually sanded over and closed in 1929.

During World War II the sea front was disrupted by the installation of the Nazi Atlantic Wall and the town suffered from bombing during the allied invasion in 1944. This contributed to the diminishing of the ancient fishing industry, which numbered some 150 boats at the turn of the century, and had all but disappeared by the 1960s. Today, although the hospital sector remains economically important, the town has again promoted itself as a tourist attraction. A seaside bathing station, with an immense beach of fine sand on the Opal Coast, it continues to be a centre for sand yachting and the new sport of surfboarding. The former Berck Plage railway station has been converted into a casino.

In 1974 the town twinned with Bad Honnef in Germany and in 1981 with Hythe in England.

Buildings
The church of Saint Jean Baptiste was restored in 1954 and the 15th century carvings on its corbels were then highlighted in paint. The choir and belfry are now listed monuments. The new church of Notre-Dame des Sables was opened in 1886 on the marketplace of the beach quarter. Its seating for 1,500 was to cater principally for holiday makers in season and the patients from the many medical establishments profiting from the sea air. There are paintings on the choir walls.

Beside its medical establishments, the beach quarter catered to the moneyed classes in the second half of the 19th century and slowly filled with grandiose villas, hotels and amenities. Among these were handsome casinos, of which the principal was the Eden, also known as the Grand Casino de la Plage, with its theatre and music hall. This was destroyed in 1944 but is survived by its equally gorgeous rival, the Kursaal. The ambitious Cottage des Dunes, which tried to unite a luxury hotel and casino, failed commercially in 1913. After a brief spell as a hospital, it entered into official use. Another official building that survived the bombing was the town hall, which was built in 1893 and has murals painted by Jan Lavezzari.

After the stone tower of St John the Baptist fell into disuse as a lighthouse, it was replaced at first by a primitive oil lamp suspended in the dunes to mark the sandbars at the river mouth. Two years later a 10-metre tower was mounted above a keeper's cottage but this became masked when the maritime hospital was built in 1861 and a new, taller tower was constructed in 1868. The two buildings, referred to locally as father and son (le père et fils), stood next to each other until they were dynamited by the Germans in 1944. The current concrete lighthouse, designed by Georges Tourry, was completed in 1951 and is 45 metres high.

Aeronautical experiments
The steady sea breezes and the updraft created by the neighbouring dunes once made the town the centre of a number of aeronautical experiments. These began in the final decades of the 19th century with early trials of photography from unmanned kites. Among the first working locally was the English meteorologist E.D.Archibald in 1887; he was followed the next year by Arthur Batut and during 1889-91 by Emile Wenz. The experiments continued until 1914 and some of the photos found commercial use on postcards.

The town has had an aerodrome since 1917. This was in part because at the start of the 20th century, the area played its part in the race to take to the air. The artist Jan Lavezzari, who had originally studied engineering, tested a double lateen sail hang glider from the Merlimont sand dunes in February 1904. He was followed there that Easter by Gabriel Voisin, who made a trial flight in a glider plane modelled on that of the Wright Brothers and over a few seconds was airborne for 50 metres.

His one-time partner Louis Blériot never experimented with flight at Berck, but he did develop and test the sand-yacht (l'aeroplage) there in 1911 and pioneered the first race over the sands in 1913. Since 1966 a six-hour endurance race has been hosted by the local Eole Club. And since 1986 there has been an annual kite-flying festival each April on the sands, attracting international exhibits of great beauty and inventiveness.

Population

The inhabitants are called Berckois. Over the past two centuries there has been a steady growth in the population of the town, which in the 1793 census was 983, only a little more than the 800 recorded in 1301. In 1851 this had doubled to 2,216 and after the commercial development during the second half of that century had climbed to 7,799 by 1901. It more than doubled again by 1936 (16,700) but fell to 11,529 by 1946 and as of 2017 stands at 14,189.

The 'Berck School' of painters
Painters joined the 19th century Parisian visitors to the town and passed on news of their discovery to fellow artists in the capital. One of the most notable was Édouard Manet, who passed a summer there with his family in 1873. Among the twenty paintings he made were depictions of boats at sea and the beachscape now in the Musée d'Orsay. Eugène Boudin first visited in 1874 and over the next twenty years made Berck the subject of some 120 paintings. He was followed in 1876 by Ludovic-Napoléon Lepic, who was so taken with the place that he set up a studio there and until 1885 devoted some six months of the year to recording the area and the fisherman's life.

Following in their footsteps came the sons of local families who, until about 1914, constituted what has been called 'the Berck School'. These included Francis Tattegrain, who was encouraged to take up art by Lepic; Jan Lavezzari, son of the town architect who was also a friend of Lepic; Charles Roussel (1861–1936), who settled in the town in 1886; and Eugène Trigoulet (1864–1910). After World War I the town and its inhabitants continued to be represented artistically by Roussel and by Louis Montaigu (1905–1988). Fishermen in interiors were a speciality of the latter.

A collection of these and other Opal Coast painters was opened in 1979 in the Municipal Museum, sited in Berck's old Gendarmerie, which was built at the end of the 19th century by Emile Lavezzari.

Berck in the arts

Among minor artists who have made Berck a subject in their work are Paul Laugée (1853–1937); Eugène Chigot (1860–1923), who had a studio there in 1893; and Georges Maroniez, a judge who painted and photographed in the area during holidays. Two others stayed in the town because of its medical facilities. Albert Besnard was there in 1895 on account of his tubercular son. As a thanks offering for his cure, Besnard and his wife Charlotte decorated the walls of the chapel in the Cazin-Perrochaud Institute between the years 1898–1901. While he was there, he also executed oil paintings and etchings. Jean Laronze (see above) was also there in 1904 for the same reason and painted several canvases during his stay.

The town figures unfavourably in the long poem "Berck-Plage" by Sylvia Plath. She had visited it in 1961 and wrote the poem a year later, mixing there memories of maimed war veterans at the Berck hospital with impressions of the recent death and funeral of a neighbour.

In Jean-Paul Sartre's Le Sursis (The Reprieve) the character of Charles is evacuated from the military hospital at Berck just before the outbreak of the Second World War. The town also figured in the novel Une année à Berck by Christian Morel de Sarcus (Paris, 1997).

Language
The language originally spoken by the inhabitants was Picard, from which originated several expressions used by fishermen. Although it has now retreated before standard French, there are still those who seek to preserve it. Berck has a language association, T'yn souvyin tu? and there have been linguistic studies of the local dialect. These include the poet Edouard Grandel's Lexique du patois berckois (Université de Picardie, Amiens, 1980), Lucien Tétu's Glossaire du parler de Berck (Société de linguistique picarde, 1981) and his À l'écoute des Berckois : Dictons et proverbes, sobriquets (Société de linguistique picarde, 1988). The Picard dialect poet Ivar Ch'Vavar was born in the town in 1951 and, though he now lives in Amiens, has often written about it, most notably in Berck (un poème), published in 1997.

Personalities
 Annette Messager, conceptual artist.
 Jean-Dominique Bauby, author of the French best seller Le scaphandre et le papillon, which was also filmed in the town.

See also
 Communes of Pas-de-Calais

References

External links

Town Guide
Musée de Berck
Rencontres Internationales des Cerfs Volants de Berck sur Mer 
An archive of old postcards

Communes of Pas-de-Calais
Seaside resorts in France